Panichishte is a resort in Bulgaria. It is located in Rila Mountain, 3 km (10 km by car) southeast of Sapareva Banya Town and not far from Dupnitsa Town.  At 1,350 meters above sea level, it lies on the border of Rila National Park. Not only it is a ski resort with sport center for various sport, but it is a spa resort too.

In 2009 an aerial lift was built to avoid a dangerous steep section of a route from and to Seven Rila Lakes. Travel time between terminals is 16 minutes.

References
Bulgariaski.com
Hotels and huts at Panichishte 

Ski areas and resorts in Bulgaria
Rila
Tourist attractions in Kyustendil Province
Buildings and structures in Kyustendil Province